Charles Garabedian (December 29, 1923 – February 11, 2016) was an American-Armenian artist known for his paintings and drawings rich in references to Greek and Chinese symbolism. His artwork reveals a deeply personal world that explores the relationship between painting and sculpture.

Biography 

Garabedian was born in Detroit, Michigan, to Armenian immigrants who had come to the U.S. to escape the Armenian genocide.  Garabedian's mother died when he was two and his father was unable to take care of the three children.  Garabedian lived in an orphanage until age nine, when he, his father, and siblings moved to Los Angeles, California.

From 1942-1945, Garabedian served as a staff sergeant in the United States Air Force and was an aerial gunner in the European theater during World War II.  Under the auspices of the G.I. Bill, Garabedian studied literature at the University of California, Santa Barbara from 1947 to 1948.  He then went on to the University of Southern California in Los Angeles, where he earned a bachelor's degree in history in 1950.  He received his master's degree in 1961 at the University of California Los Angeles. He did not, however, become an artist until later in his life.

When in his forties, Garabedian began to explore the relationships between painting and drawing. His fascination with China is reflected in many of his pieces incorporating dragons and ornate grillwork and pattern. Although his most prolific period was in the late 1960s, later in his life he still continued to paint. The  first solo exhibition of his work was held at the Ceeje gallery in Los Angeles (1963) and subsequent one man shows followed at the Fine Arts Gallery at California State University, Northridge (1974), and The Whitney Museum of American Art, New York City (1976). His group exhibitions include the Whitney Museum of American Art Biennial Exhibition: Contemporary American Art, New York (1975) and others. In 1979, he was a recipient of a Guggenheim Fellowship for Fine Arts. In 2011, the Santa Barbara Museum of Art hosted a retrospective of Garabedian's work. He died on February 11, 2016, at the age of 92.

References

External links
Charles Garabedian biography at LA Louver gallery
Charles Garabedian interview at the Smithsonian Archives of American Art
KCRW's Art Talk on Garabedian's retrospective as one of the most memorable art exhibits of 2011.

20th-century American painters
American male painters
21st-century American painters
Artists from Los Angeles
Painters from California
1923 births
American people of Armenian descent
University of California, Santa Barbara alumni
University of California, Los Angeles alumni
University of Southern California alumni
2016 deaths
American military personnel of World War II
20th-century American male artists